Civic Duty is a 2006 thriller film directed by Jeff Renfroe and starring Peter Krause, Khaled Abol Naga, Kari Matchett, and Richard Schiff.

Plot
The film is about an American accountant bombarded with cable news and the media's obsession with terrorist plots in the post 9/11 world, who receives a jolt when an unattached Islamic graduate student moves in next door.

Cast

Critical reception
Richard Nilsen, film critic for The Arizona Republic, liked the film at times, but gave the film a mixed review.  He wrote, "It does build up considerable suspense and tension; Renfroe has learned well from Hitchcock. And the final confrontation builds to a harrowing pitch. But that can't rescue the film from a silly, melodramatic finish."

Gabe Hassan (played by actor Khaled Abol Naga, who is a star in his native Egypt, perhaps the most handsome would-be modern day terrorist ever) gives an inspired performance as the terrorist / grad student who challenges the lunatic (Peter Krause) that has him captive and effectively glides over a range of emotions

References

External links
 
 Civic Duty film review by Richard Roeper (At the Movies)
 

2006 films
2006 thriller films
English-language Canadian films
American thriller films
British thriller films
Canadian thriller films
Films directed by Jeff Renfroe
2000s English-language films
2000s American films
2000s Canadian films
2000s British films